Friseria nona is a moth of the family Gelechiidae. It is found in North America, where it has been recorded from Arizona.

The wingspan is 10-13.5 mm. The coloration of the adults is similar to that of Friseria repentina, but the orange of repentina is generally replaced with buff.

References

Moths described in 1966
Friseria